Uberman may refer to:

 Übermensch, Friedrich Nietzsche's Superman
 The Uberman's sleep schedule, a form of polyphasic sleep cycle